Graphops pubescens is a species of leaf beetle. It is found in North America.

References

Further reading

 

Eumolpinae
Articles created by Qbugbot
Beetles described in 1847
Taxa named by Frederick Ernst Melsheimer
Beetles of North America